Felsőtárkány Sport Club is a professional football club based in Felsőtárkány; Heves County, Hungary. The club competes in the Heves county league.

Name changes
1951-2008: Felsőtárkányi TSz SK
?-2008: Felsőtárkány SE
2008-2015: Felsőtárkány SC
2012-2015: Fortress-Felsőtárkány SC
2015-2017: Felsőtárkány SC
2017-2018: Beton-Termék Felsőtárkány SC
2018-present: Felsőtárkány SC

Honours
Nemzeti Bajnokság III:
Winners: 2012-13

External links
 Profile on Magyar Futball

References

Football clubs in Hungary
Association football clubs established in 1951
1951 establishments in Hungary